No Name Glacier is located on Mount Baker in the North Cascades of the U.S. state of Washington. The glacier is between Mazama and Bastile Glaciers, a half mile south of Hadley Peak.

See also 
List of glaciers in the United States

References 

Glaciers of Mount Baker
Glaciers of Washington (state)